Baćo Nikolić (born 19 January 1986) is a Montenegrin football midfielder.

Club career
Following a run of poor performances, Tomić was released by Flamurtari Vlorë alongside Vukašin Tomić and Yani Urdinov on 16 April 2015.

In February 2018, Nikolić joined FK Otrant. He then joined Bosnian club OFK Sloga Gornje Crnjelovo, which he left again on 17 January 2019, the club announced.

By early 2019 he returned to Serbia and joined FK Drina Ljubovija, and six months later moved to an also third-level side, FK Timočanin.

References

External links
 
 
 Baćo Nikolić stats at utakmica.rs 
 

1986 births
Living people
Footballers from Nikšić
Association football wingers
Serbia and Montenegro footballers
Montenegrin footballers
FK Sutjeska Nikšić players
OFK Petrovac players
FK Lovćen players
FC Sheriff Tiraspol players
OFK Grbalj players
FK Borac Čačak players
Flamurtari Vlorë players
FK Mladost Velika Obarska players
FK Mornar players
FK Iskra Danilovgrad players
FK Dečić players
FK Timočanin players
First League of Serbia and Montenegro players
Montenegrin First League players
Moldovan Super Liga players
Serbian First League players
Serbian SuperLiga players
Kategoria Superiore players
First League of the Republika Srpska players
Montenegrin Second League players
Montenegrin expatriate footballers
Expatriate footballers in Moldova
Montenegrin expatriate sportspeople in Moldova
Expatriate footballers in Serbia
Montenegrin expatriate sportspeople in Serbia
Expatriate footballers in Albania
Montenegrin expatriate sportspeople in Albania
Expatriate footballers in Bosnia and Herzegovina
Montenegrin expatriate sportspeople in Bosnia and Herzegovina